Lupocyclus is a genus of crabs, containing six species:
Lupocyclus inaequalis (Walker, 1887)
Lupocyclus mauriciensis Ward, 1942
Lupocyclus philippinensis Semper, 1880 (scissor swimming crab)
Lupocyclus quinquedentatus Rathbun, 1906
Lupocyclus rotundatus Adams & White, 1849
Lupocyclus tugelae Barnard, 1950

References

Portunoidea